Yonca Şevval Erdem (born ) is a  Turkish water polo player, playing at the wing position. She is part of the Turkey women's national water polo team. She competed at the 2016 Women's European Water Polo Championship.

She is a member of 35 Water Polo and Swimming Club.

References

1996 births
Living people
Turkish female water polo players
Place of birth missing (living people)